Maria Vorontsova may refer to;

 Maria Vorontsova, pediatric endocrinologist, eldest daughter of Russian President Vladimir Putin
 Maria Vorontsova (botanist)